Phycopsis may refer to:
 Phycopsis (sponge), a genus of sponges in the family Axinellidae
 Phycopsis, a genus of fungi in the family Seuratiaceae, synonym of Seuratia
 Drosera sect. Phycopsis, section of plants in the genus Drosera (Droseraceae)